"Sunday" is a 1926 song written by Chester Conn, with lyrics by Jule Styne, Bennie Krueger, Ned Miller, which has become a jazz standard recorded by many artists. The tune has been fitted out to various lyrics, but best known in the original version of  British-American songwriter Jule Styne: "I'm blue every Monday, thinking over Sunday, that one day that I'm with you"

Early successful recordings in 1927 were made by Jean Goldkette and His Orchestra; Cliff Edwards; and Gene Austin.

Other notable recordings
Frank Sinatra - included in his album Swing Easy! (1954)
Bing Crosby recorded the song in 1955 for use on his radio show and it was subsequently included in the box set The Bing Crosby CBS Radio Recordings (1954-56) issued by Mosaic Records (catalog MD7-245) in 2009. 
Pat Boone - for his album Howdy! (1956).
Johnny Hartman - included in his album And I Thought About You (1959). 
Kay Starr (1956) and later for her album Kay Starr: Jazz Singer (1960)
Al Martino - included in his album Swing Along with Al Martino (1959).
Carmen McRae - included in the album The Great American Songbook (1972)
Michael Feinstein and Jule Styne - for the album Michael Feinstein Sings the Jule Styne Songbook (1991).

References

1926 songs
Songs with music by Jule Styne
Songs written by Chester Conn